Franklin Parish School Board is a school district headquartered in Winnsboro, Louisiana, United States. The district serves Franklin Parish.

The Franklin Parish superintendent is john Gullet, a former Superintendent of caldwell parish schools

School uniforms
The district requires all students to wear school uniforms.

Schools

High schools
 Franklin Parish High School (Winnsboro)

Pre-K–8 schools
 Baskin School (Baskin)
 Crowville School (Crowville, Louisiana)
 Fort Necessity Junior High School (Fort, Louisiana)
 Gilbert Junior High School (Gilbert)

Elementary schools
 PreK-5: Winnsboro Elementary School (Winnsboro)

Alternative schools
 Horace G. White Sr. Learning Center

References

External links
 

Education in Franklin Parish, Louisiana
School districts in Louisiana